Ge Guangrui (葛光锐, Shanghai, 1929) is a Chinese composer. His best known opera is We have our own successors (Chinese: 自有後来人 Zi you houlai ren). He also worked on Chen Zi's 1954 opera Liu Hulan.

References

People's Republic of China composers
Chinese male classical composers
Chinese classical composers
Chinese opera composers
Male opera composers
1929 births
Living people
Musicians from Shanghai